The 2006–07 UCI America Tour was the third season for the UCI America Tour. The season began on 1 October 2006 with the Clásico Ciclístico Banfoandes and ended on 15 September 2007 with the Tour de Leelanau.

The points leader, based on the cumulative results of previous races, wears the UCI America Tour cycling jersey. José Serpa of Colombia was the defending champion of the 2005–06 UCI America Tour. Svein Tuft of Canada was crowned as the 2006–07 UCI America Tour champion.

Throughout the season, points are awarded to the top finishers of stages within stage races and the final general classification standings of each of the stages races and one-day events. The quality and complexity of a race also determines how many points are awarded to the top finishers, the higher the UCI rating of a race, the more points are awarded.

The UCI ratings from highest to lowest are as follows:
 Multi-day events: 2.HC, 2.1 and 2.2
 One-day events: 1.HC, 1.1 and 1.2

Events

2006

2007

Final standings

Individual classification

Team classification

Nation classification

Nation under-23 classification

External links

UCI America Tour
2007 in road cycling
2006 in road cycling
UCI
UCI
UCI
UCI